Simon Patterson (born 1967) is an English artist and was born in Leatherhead, Surrey. He was shortlisted for the Turner Prize in 1996 for his exhibitions at the Lisson Gallery, the Gandy Gallery, and three shows in Japan. He is the younger brother of the painter Richard Patterson.

Life and career

Patterson attended Hertfordshire College of Art and Design and Goldsmiths College between 1985 and 1989. At Goldsmiths he was included in the Freeze Exhibition organized by Damien Hirst, showing two wall text pieces, one simply showing the names Richard Burton and Elizabeth Taylor, the other, The Last Supper Arranged According to the Flat Back Four Formation (Jesus Christ in Goal) showing the names of the Apostles arranged as different football team systems with Jesus in goal.

He is perhaps best known for his work The Great Bear from 1992, an editioned print which reworks the London Underground map. Patterson is taking an order system that exists within the world and applies it to another set of subjects. In this case he switched the names from the stations with names from famous people. Each Line is a different group of people, like actors, philosophers, footballers etc. An edition was purchased by Charles Saatchi and shown in the Sensation exhibition of 1997 which toured London, Berlin and New York. An edition is in the Tate Gallery collection and is currently on display at Tate Britain in London.

Patterson has also created large scale projects such as Cosmic Wallpaper at the University of Warwick, a Wilfred Owen tribute (Maison Forestière)
, and he also participated in the MoMA's "The Project Series, 70, Banners I". The projects goal for each Simon, Shirin Neshat and Xu Bing was to test the ramifications of the written word in their own unique perspective to be display at the Museum’s Fifty-third Street facade flanked by banners bearing MoMA’s logo from 22 November 1999 – 1 May 2000.

Simon Patterson was a staff member at the Slade School of Fine Art.

Exhibitions
"Freeze" Group Exhibition (Parts 1 & 3), PLA Building, London Docklands Freeze (1988), London.
Third Eye Centre  (1989), Glasgow.
"Instructions and Diagrams"  (1992), London.
"Doubletake: Collective Memory and Current Art"  (1992), London
"General Assembly"  (1994), Nottingham
"Mapping" MoMA Group Exhibition  (1994), New York City
"Seeing the Unseen" Invisible Museum  (1994), London
"Museum of Contemporary Art, Chicago"  (1994), Chicago
"Lisson Gallery"  (1996), London
Solo Exhibition, Röntgen Kunstinstitut(1995), Japan.
"Cartographers" Galerjie Grada Zagreba, Zagreb. Touring to Centre for Contemporary Art  (1997), Warsaw
"Manned Flight" Baskerville House  (1 November 2000 – 31 January 2001), London
"Sies+Hoeke Galerie" Solo Exhibition  (2001), Düsseldorf
"Manned flight and Colour Match" Solo Exhibition, Lille  (2001), France
"Exhibitions: Paper Democracy. Contemporary Art in Editions on Paper" Group Exhibition, Edifício Cultura Inglesa  (23 September - December 2004), São Paulo
"Domini Canes. Hounds of God" Lowood Gallery and Kennels  (1 November 2000 – 31 January 2001), London
"High Noon" Solo Exhibition at The Fruitmarket Gallery  (26 February - 1 May 2005), Edinburgh.
"Come to Light, Cell Projects"  (2005), London.
"Tall Stories" MOT, Group Exhibition  (13 August - 17 September 2005), London.
"100 Artists see God" Independent Curators International (ICI), The Jewish Museum, San Francisco; Laguna Museum, Laguna California; ICA, London; Contemporary Art Center of Virginia, Virginia; Albright College Freedman Art Gallery, Reading, Pennsylvania; and Cheekwood Museum of Art, Nashville, Tennessee; Group Exhibition  (2004–2006), San Francisco.
"Plantation Lane" Architecture on the streets of London with Arup Associates  (2006), London.
"Sarah and Simon" Platform Gallery  (2006), London.
"This will not happen without you: from the collective archive of the Basement Group" Projects UK and Locus+ 1977-2006, John Hansard Gallery, Southampton, touring to the Hatton Gallery, Newcastle upon Tyne and Interface Gallery, Belfast  (2006), Belfast.
"(C)Artography: Mapmaking as Artform" Crawford Art Gallery,   (2007), Cork.
"No Future" Crawford Art Gallery,  (29 September – 10 November 2007), Bloomberg Space.
"Rights of Way" Café Gallery,  (17 May – 8 July 2007), Southwark Park.
"Mapping The Imagination" The Victoria and Albert Museum  (2007), London.
"Mapping" Bury Art Gallery, Museum and Archives  (1 April – 14 July 2007), Bury.
"Black-List" Solo Exhibition at Haunch of Venison Gallery  (19 January - 24 February 2007), London.
"Long Distance Information" British Council Arts, National Gallery of Bengal Arts in Dhaka, Bangladesh (24 January - 15 February), PNCA in Islamabad, Pakistan (5 March – 11 April 2008) and the Museum of Fine Art, Almaty, Kazakhstan from 29 April - 13 May 2008  (24 January - 24 May 2008), London.
"International Match" at Carinthian Museum of Modern Art (Museum Moderner Kunst Kärnten/MMKK)  (8 May - 29 June 2008), Klagenfurt.
"Simon Patterson: the Undersea World and Other Stories" Solo Exhibition, The National Maritime Museum  (4 May - 26 October 2008), Greenwich.
"Simon Patterson: In Orbit" Solo Exhibition, Roentgenwerke  (3 October - 3 November 2008), Tokyo.
"Dazzle Ships" Graniph Gallery, Solo Exhibition  (3 October - 3 November 2008), Fukuoka.
"Wilfred Owen : La Maison Forestière - Time Piece" Solo Exhibition  (26 April - 30 May 2008), Lille.
"Smoke" Pumphouse Gallery  (5 October - 14 December 2008), London.
"Print the Legend: the Myth of the West" Group Exhibition, The Fruitmarket Gallery  (1 March - 4 May 2008), Edinburgh.
"Kilkenny Arts Festival" Group Exhibition  (8–17 August 2008), Kilkenny.
"Irony & Gesture" Kukje Gallery, touring to Kring Gallery  (17 July - 14 August 2008), Seoul.
"BP Exhibition - Classified: Contemporary British Art" Tate Britain  (22 June - 23 August 2009), London.
"Ballpark" De La Mota  (14 November - 9 March 2009), Barcelona.
"B-Sides and Rarities" Group Exhibition  (20 September - 6 December 2009), Breda.
"GAGARIN The Artists in their Own Words" SMAK  (4 December 2009 – 14 March 2010), Ghent.
"Mythologies" Group Exhibition at 6 Burlington Gardens  (2009), London.
"Anthology" Solo Exhibition at Benrimon Contemporary Gallery  (6 November - 18 December 2010), New York City.
"Under Cartel" Solo Exhibition at Haunch of Venison Gallery  (13 July - 31 August 2012), London.
"Out of Order" Solo Exhibition at Wolfson College, Cambridge  (6 November 2022 - 22 January 2023), Cambridge.

References

External links
 Contemporary Art Society, Annual Report 2001/2002
 Contemporary Art Society, Annual Report 1999/2000
 Christie's, Auction Results for Simon Patterson
 Artnet, Biography and Selected Exhibitions
 Simon Patterson interviewed by Robert Dingle, 2009-10
 Tate, Intermedia Art - Le Match des Colors - Simon Patterson
 Artconnexion.org - La Maison Forestière Wilfred Owen - Simon Patterson
 The Oxford Times - A room of one's Owen - Simon Patterson
 Aajpress.wordpress.com - Simon Patterson: La Maison Forestière. Dedicated to the British poet Wilfred Owen, 2011
 La Maison Forestière by Simon Patterson
 Artnews.org
 Locus+
 Benrimon Contemporary - New York, USA
 Simon Patterson - Catalog for Anthology Exhibition, 2010
 Haunch of Venison - London, United Kingdom

Video
 BBC News Magazine - Wilfred Owen: From humble cottage to dazzling tribute
 BBC Collective - Simon Patterson video interview
 Haunch of Venison - Simon Patterson video interview for Under Cartel Exhibition

Books
 Eye on Europe - Publisher: Museum of Modern Art - 
 Paint Ten Rooms - Publisher: Locus and International Design Publishing - 
 Domini Canes: The Hounds of God - Publisher: Axis Projects - 
 Paper Democracy: Contemporary Art in Editions on Paper - Publisher: Associacao Cultura Inglesa de Sao Paulo - 
 Simon Patterson - Publisher: Locus+ - 
 Plantation Lane: Time and Tide - Publisher: RIBA Publishing - 
 Republicans - Publisher: Third Eye Centre - 
 High Noon - Publisher: Edinburgh - 
 Simon Patterson: Black-list - Publisher: Haunch of Venison, c2006 - 
 Rex Reason - Publisher: Book Works - 
 Offside! Contemporary Artists and Football - Publisher: Institute of International Visual Arts (INIVA) - 

People from Leatherhead
Alumni of Goldsmiths, University of London
1967 births
Living people
English contemporary artists